Bitter/Sweet is a 2009 romantic comedy film.

Premise
Brian Chandler (Kip Pardue), an American businessman, is sent to Thailand by his boss, coffee mogul Calvert Jenkins (James Brolin) in search of local coffee beans to purchase.  Upon arrival to Thailand, Brian is met by Ticha (Napakpapha Nakprasitte) who becomes his guide, as he finds more than just coffee, and finds out what the original purpose of his trip is.

See also
 List of American films of 2009

External links
 

Thai romantic comedy films
2009 films
American romantic comedy films
2009 romantic comedy films
Thai-language films
2000s English-language films
2000s American films
2009 multilingual films
American multilingual films
Thai multilingual films